Aqa Choqlu (also Romanized as Āqā Choqlū; also known as Āqā Joghlū and Āq Joqlū) is a village in Qeshlaqat-e Afshar Rural District, Afshar District, Khodabandeh County, Zanjan Province, Iran. At the 2006 census, its population was 209, in 44 families.

References 

Populated places in Khodabandeh County